Leptodactylodon, also known as egg frogs, is a genus of frog in the family Arthroleptidae. It contains 15 species. Members of this genus can be found in eastern Nigeria and western and southwestern Cameroon, Equatorial Guinea, and Gabon.

Species 
There are 15 species:

References 

 
Arthroleptidae
Amphibians of Africa
Amphibian genera
Taxonomy articles created by Polbot
Taxa named by Lars Gabriel Andersson